Zheng Shuyin (born 1 May 1994) is a Chinese taekwondo athlete.

She represented China at the 2016 Summer Olympics in Rio de Janeiro, in the women's +67 kg, and won the gold medal, which China has not won since 2004 Summer Olympic Games in Athens.

In May 2019 at the 2019 World Taekwondo Championships, Zheng lost the final against Bianca Walkden for the women's heavyweight title. Zheng was disqualified despite leading 20-10 because Walkden repeatedly forced Zheng out of the ring to accumulate Zheng's penalty points.

In September 2019 at Chiba, four months after winning the controversial goal medal in Manchester, Walkden was defeated 7-5 by Zheng Shuyin. In October 2019 at Sofia, Zheng Shuyin defeated Walkden once again by 3-2.

See also
List of Olympic medalists in taekwondo
List of Youth Olympic Games gold medalists who won Olympic gold medals

References

External links

1994 births
Living people
Sportspeople from Liaoning
Athletes from Liaoning
People from Dandong
Sportspeople from Dandong
Chinese female taekwondo practitioners
Olympic taekwondo practitioners of China
Taekwondo practitioners at the 2016 Summer Olympics
Taekwondo practitioners at the 2010 Summer Youth Olympics
2016 Olympic gold medalists for China
Olympic medalists in taekwondo
Southwest University alumni
Universiade medalists in taekwondo
Universiade gold medalists for China
Youth Olympic gold medalists for China
Medalists at the 2015 Summer Universiade
Taekwondo practitioners at the 2020 Summer Olympics
21st-century Chinese women